This is a list of places in Brazil which are named after people :

Anchieta, Brazil - Father José de Anchieta
 Assis Brasil - Joaquim Francisco de Assis Brasil (Brazilian lawyer, politician, diplomat, writer and poet)
Benjamin Constant, Amazonas, Brazil - Benjamin Constant (Brazilian politician, writer and journalist)
 Blumenau, Brazil, - Hermann Blumenau (German founder of colony)
Campos Sales, Brazil - Manuel Ferraz de Campos Sales (a president of Brazil)
Carlos Chagas, Minas Gerais, Brazil - Carlos Chagas (discoverer of Chagas disease)
Duque de Caxias, Brazil - Luís Alves de Lima e Silva, Duke of Caxias, Brazilian general and politician
Epitaciolândia, Acre, Brazil - Epitácio da Silva Pessoa (a Brazilian president)
Euclides da Cunha, Bahia - Euclides da Cunha (Brazilian writer)
Florianópolis, Brazil - Floriano Peixoto (a president of Brazil)
Francisco Alves - Brazilian singer Francisco Alves (1898 - 1952)
Gonçalves Dias, Maranhão, Brazil - Antônio Gonçalves Dias (a Brazilian poet)
João Pessoa, Paraíba, Brazil - João Pessoa Cavalcanti de Albuquerque, governor of the state of Paraíba
Mâncio Lima - Mâncio Antonio Rodrigues Lima (1875–1950) (founder of a town)
Manoel Urbano - Manoel Urbano (died 1897), an Amazonian mestizo from the Manacapurú region who had explored the Purus River
Marechal Deodoro, Amazonas, Brazil - Manuel Deodoro da Fonseca (a president of Brazil)
Marechal Floriano, Espírito Santo, Brazil - Floriano Peixoto (a president of Brazil)
Nilo Peçanha, Brazil, Bahia - Nilo Peçanha (a Brazilian president)
Nilópolis, Brazil - Nilo Peçanha (a Brazilian president)
Peçanha, Brazil - Nilo Peçanha
Petrópolis, Brazil - Pedro II, emperor of Brazil
 Porto Walter - Walter do Carvalho (early resident of Acre)
Presidente Bernardes, Brazil - Artur da Silva Bernardes (a Brazilian president)
Presidente Dutra, Brazil - Eurico Gaspar Dutra (a Brazilian president)
Presidente Epitácio, Brazil - Epitâcio da Silva Pessoa (a Brazilian president)
Presidente Figueiredo, Brazil  - João Baptista de Oliveira Figueiredo (a Brazilian president) 
Presidente Getúlio, Brazil - Getúlio Vargas (a Brazilian president) 
Presidente Jânio Quadros, Brazil Jânio Quadros (a Brazilian president)
Presidente Juscelino, Brazil - Juscelino Kubitschek (a Brazilian president)
Presidente Kennedy, Espírito Santo, Brazil - John Fitzgerald Kennedy (American president)
Presidente Médici, Brazil - Emílio Garrastazu Médici (a Brazilian president)
Presidente Prudente and Prudente de Morais, Brazil - Prudente José de Morais Barros (a Brazilian president)
Presidente Tancredo Neves - Tancredo Neves (a Brazilian President who died in 1985)
Presidente Sarney, Maranhão, Brazil - José Sarney (a Brazilian president)
Rio Branco, Acre, Brazil - Barão do Rio Branco (Brazilian politician and diplomat)
Rondonópolis and Rondolândia, Brazil - Cândido Rondon (Brazilian military officer and explorer)
Ruy Barbosa, Brazil - Ruy Barbosa (Brazilian jurist, politician and diplomat)
Salesópolis, Brazil - Manuel Ferraz de Campos Sales (a president of Brazil)
Salvador, Brazil - Jesus (the Christian Savior)
Santos Dumont, Brazil - Alberto Santos Dumont, inventor of aircraft
Santos Dumont, Minas Gerais - Alberto Santos Dumont
São Paulo - Saint Paul
São Luís, Maranhão, Brazil - Louis IX of France (Saint Louis)
São Vicente, Brazil - Saint Vincent
São Sebastião, São Paulo, Brazil - Saint Sebastian
Senador Guiomard - José Guiomard dos Santos (1907 - 1983), (Brazilian senator)
Sud Mennucci, São Paulo, Brazil - journalist and educator Sud Mennucci
Teresina, Piauí, Brazil - Empress Tereza Christina of Brazil, wife of Pedro II
Teresópolis - Empress Tereza Christina of Brazil, wife of Pedro II

See also
List of places named after people
List of country subdivisions named after people
List of islands named after people
Buildings and structures named after people
List of eponyms of airports
List of convention centers named after people
List of railway stations named after people
Lists of places by eponym
List of eponyms
Lists of etymologies

Brazil
Brazil
Places

pl:Eponimy nazw geograficznych